The 2012 UCI Mountain Bike & Trials World Championships was the 23rd edition of the UCI Mountain Bike & Trials World Championships and was held in Leogang and Saalfelden, Austria.

Medal summary

Medal table

See also
2012 UCI Mountain Bike World Cup

References

External links

 
UCI Mountain Bike World Championships
UCI Mountain Bike World Championships
2012 UCI Mountain Bike World Championships
UCI Mountain Bike World Championships
Mountain biking events in Austria
Sport in Salzburg (state)